The Bronze Cross is a certification in water rescue that is the mainstay of the lifesaving training offered in Canada, and  awarded by the Royal Life Saving Society of Canada.  Before one can take the Bronze Cross course, the Bronze Medallion (Canada) is required. With Bronze Cross and Standard First Aid certification, one can be an assistant lifeguard in some provinces. For National Lifeguard Certification or to become an Instructor, a current or expired Bronze Cross and current Standard First Aid certification are required. The Bronze Cross endurance swim requirement is 400 meters in 11 minutes using  either front swim, back swim, breast stroke throughout the swim.

Prerequisites
The Lifesaving Society requires Bronze Cross candidates have obtained the following certifications, which may be current or expired: 
 Bronze Medallion

References

Canadian awards
Lifesaving